The First Battle of Changsha (17 September 1939 – 6 October 1939) was the first of four attempts by Japan to take the city of Changsha, Hunan, during the second Sino-Japanese War. It was the first major battle of the war to fall within the time frame of what is widely considered World War II.

Background and strategy 
The war had reached a stalemate after two years of fighting. Professor Fu Sinian  noted in July 1939 that while the Chinese army had become stronger, the Japanese army had weakened.

On 15 August, the 11th Army came up with the general plans for a campaign south of the Yangtze, ranging  from the Xinjiang River to the Gan River. In early September, Japanese General Toshizō Nishio of the "Japanese Expeditionary Forces to China" and Lieutenant-General Seishirō Itagaki set out to capture Changsha, the provincial capital of Hunan. The Japanese 101st and 106th Divisions were deployed on the western bank of the Gan River in northern Jiangxi, and the 6th, 3rd, 13th, and 33rd Divisions marched southward from southern Hubei to northern Hunan.

Two of the primary motivating factors for the Japanese in launching the attack were the signing of a non-aggression pact by their German ally with their Soviet enemy, and their defeat by Soviet forces at Nomonhan. A large attack on the Chinese would therefore restore morale. In addition, Germany's invasion of Poland starting on 1 September 1939 gave the Japanese further motivation to crush China's will to fight in order to pave the way for the establishment of Wang Jingwei's puppet government in Central China.

Altogether, it became obvious that the 100,000 strong Japanese force was to converge on Changsha. The Chinese strategy was to counter the enemy column in northern Jiangxi and then encircle the line on the path southward.

Order of battle for Battle of Changsha (1939)

Course of battle 
On the night of 14 September 1939, Lieutenant General Ryotaro Nakai's 106th Division drove westward from north of Fengxin , Jiangxi, against Wan Baobang's 184th Division of the Chinese 60th Corps. After fierce fighting, the defending forces abandoned Gao'an. The bulk of Japanese forces then moved northwest to assault Shangfu, Ganfang, and Xiushui. In coordination with Nakai, Lieutenant General Jutaro Amakasu's 33rd Division assaulted Guan Linzheng's  15th Army Group from the south.

Having recently captured important strategic locations in Jiangxi Province, Japanese troops began their attacks on Changsha in earnest on 17 September. The Japanese 101st Division (Lieutenant General Masatoshi Saito) and 106th Division started marching westward towards Changsha in neighboring Hunan Province. Meanwhile, the 3rd Division (Lieutenant General Shinichi Fujita), 6th Division (Lieutenant General Shiro Inaba), 13th Division (General Shizuichi Tanaka), and 33rd Division invaded northern Hunan Province to put additional pressure on Changsha. However, the Japanese stretched too far out westward and were counter-attacked by Chinese forces from the south and the north, forcing them to retreat eastward.

On 19 September, Japanese forces proceeded to attack Chinese defensive positions along the Xinqiang River  with poison gas on a wide scale. Japan had not signed the Geneva Protocol (1925).

After having recovered Cunqianjie on 19 September, Wang Yaowu's  74th Corps (51D, 57D, & 58D) and Song Ketang's 32nd Corps (139D & 141D) retook Gao'an in a counterattack on 22 September.

On 23 September Japanese forces drove the Chinese out of the Xinqiang river area, and the 6th and 13th Divisions crossed the river under a cover of heavy artillery, advancing further south along the Miluo River. East of Changsha, naval vessels landed the Shanghai Special Naval Landing Forces and portions of the 3rd Division, surrounding Changsha on three sides.

Heavy fighting continued afterwards and the Chinese retreated southward as distraction for the Japanese while supporting battalions arrived on the east and the west for an encirclement maneuver. By 29 September, vanguard troops of the Japanese 6th Division had reached the outskirts of Changsha. However, due to the heavy casualties they had incurred, estimated at over 40,000, with a significant portion being fatalities, as well as the dangerous possibility of their overstretched supply lines being completely severed from constant harassment, Japanese forces were forced to withdraw across Laodao River. Acting group army commander Guan Linzheng issued orders at once for 52nd and 73rd Corps to pursue the Japanese to Miluo River. General Xue Yue  ordered a general counterattack on 3 October in pursuit of the Japanese who were south of Chongyang  and Yueyang.

On 5 October, Chinese troops shot down a Japanese aircraft with orders from General Yasuji Okamura to call off the Changsha offensive, and the nearby Chinese 23rd Division attacked a Japanese Navy port at Yingtian (now Miluo), damaging several vessels. By 6 October, Japanese forces at Changsha were decimated and retreating. Two days later, the remnants fled northward over the Miluo River while the Chinese 195th Division of the 52nd Corps pursued them across the Xinqiang River to recapture their former forward positions. At night, the Chinese launched raids into Xitang and Yaolin.

By 10 October, Chinese forces had completely regained their former territories in northern Hunan Province, southern Hubei Province and northern Jiangxi Province.

Conclusion 
Changsha was the first major city to successfully repel Japanese advances. Retaining the city allowed the Nationalist Chinese forces to prevent the Japanese from consolidating their territories in Southern China. The commander of the city's defense, General Xue Yue, was a graduate of the Republic of China Military Academy and a Chiang Kai-shek loyalist.

See also
 Battle of Changsha (1941)
 Battle of Changsha (1941–1942)
 Battle of Changsha (1944)
 Battle of Changsha (TV series), the TV series depicting this event

References

Changsha 1939
Changsha 1939
History of Changsha
1939 in China
1939 in Japan
September 1939 events
October 1939 events
Articles containing video clips